Higher Education: The International Journal of Higher Education Research is a bimonthly peer-reviewed academic journal covering educational developments throughout the world in universities, polytechnics, colleges, and vocational and educational institutions. The journal reports on developments in both public and private higher education. It is published by Springer Science+Business Media. According to the Journal Citation Reports, the journal has a 2018 impact factor of 3.0.

References

External links

Education journals
Higher education
Springer Science+Business Media academic journals
Publications established in 1972
Works about academia
English-language journals